Emmanuel Pavlis (born 4 December 2002) is an Australian professional footballer who plays as a forward for 
Portuguese club Pedras Salgadas on loan from Chaves.

References 

2002 births
Soccer players from Sydney
Sportsmen from New South Wales
Australian people of Greek descent
Living people
Australian soccer players
Association football forwards
Apollon Larissa F.C. players
Kallithea F.C. players
Egaleo F.C. players
G.D. Chaves players
Juventude de Pedras Salgadas players
Super League Greece 2 players
Campeonato de Portugal (league) players
Australian expatriate soccer players
Expatriate footballers in Greece
Australian expatriate sportspeople in Greece
Expatriate footballers in Portugal
Australian expatriate sportspeople in Portugal